"Heaven Is a Place on Earth" is a song by American singer Belinda Carlisle from her second studio album, Heaven on Earth (1987). Written by Rick Nowels and Ellen Shipley, the song was released as the lead single from the Heaven on Earth album on September 14, 1987, and it reached number one on the US Billboard Hot 100 on December 5, 1987, becoming Carlisle's only US chart-topper to date. A month later it peaked at number one in the United Kingdom, where it held the top spot of the UK Singles Chart for two weeks. It is considered to be Carlisle's signature song.

The song was nominated for the Grammy Award for Best Female Pop Vocal Performance in 1988, but lost out to Whitney Houston's "I Wanna Dance with Somebody (Who Loves Me)". In 2017, ShortList's Dave Fawbert listed the song as containing "one of the greatest key changes in music history".

In 2015, Carlisle re-recorded the song as an acoustic ballad. This version appeared on her album Wilder Shores (2017), which combines acoustic tracks with world beats and traditional Sikh chants.

Composition
The song is performed in the key of E major, with a tempo of 123 beats per minute in common time. Carlisle's vocals span from E3 to D5. In the final chorus of the song, the key shifts up a tone to F major.

Production
Carlisle's backup vocalists on the song include songwriters Nowels and Shipley as well as Michelle Phillips of The Mamas & the Papas, Chynna Phillips of Wilson Phillips, and songwriter Diane Warren. It also features Thomas Dolby on synthesizers.

Chart performance
"Heaven Is a Place on Earth" reached number one on the US Billboard Hot 100 and number seven on the Adult Contemporary chart. It was also a number-one hit in the United Kingdom, topping the UK Singles Chart for two weeks.

The single also reached number one in many other countries, among them Switzerland, Ireland, Zimbabwe, Sweden, South Africa and Norway. It also reached number three in Germany and Canada, number two in Australia, and number six in Italy. It reached gold status in Canada and platinum status in the United Kingdom.

Music video
The promotional music video for the song was directed by actress Diane Keaton and includes an appearance by Carlisle's husband Morgan Mason. It features children wearing black masks and capes, and holding illuminated plastic globes. Carlisle appears wearing a strapless dress and later changes to a black off-the-shoulder blouse. The video was partially filmed at Six Flags Magic Mountain theme park in Valencia, California (now Santa Clarita, California), on the now-defunct Spin Out ride.

In popular culture 
The song appears in Harold and Kumar Escape from Guantanamo Bay (2008), Love & Other Drugs (2010), and the Black Mirror episode "San Junipero" (2016), and it is sung by the protagonist June Osbourne in the Handmaid’s Tale episode “Heroic” (2019). The song is referenced in Lana Del Rey's 2011 debut single "Video Games". The artist as well as the song are referenced in "Belinda Says", from Canadian band Alvvays' 2022 album Blue Rev.

Track listing
 "Heaven Is a Place on Earth" – 4:06
 "We Can Change" – 3:45
 "Heaven Is a Place on Earth" (The Heavenly version) – 5:59
 "Heaven Is a Place on Earth" (a cappella version) – 3:49

Charts

Weekly charts

Year-end charts

Certifications

See also
 List of Billboard number-one singles
 List of number-one singles and albums in Sweden

References

External links
 Belinda Carlisle - A Place On Earth.

1987 songs
1987 singles
Belinda Carlisle songs
Billboard Hot 100 number-one singles
Cashbox number-one singles
European Hot 100 Singles number-one singles
Irish Singles Chart number-one singles
MCA Records singles
Number-one singles in New Zealand
Number-one singles in Norway
Number-one singles in Sweden
Number-one singles in Switzerland
Number-one singles in Zimbabwe
Song recordings produced by Rick Nowels
Songs written by Ellen Shipley
Songs written by Rick Nowels
UK Singles Chart number-one singles
American power pop songs